Kunzea recurva is a flowering plant in the myrtle family, Myrtaceae and is endemic to Western Australia. It is an uncommon shrub with small leaves and groups of pink or purplish flowers on the ends of the branches.

Description
The base of the leaves is pressed against the stem but the tips spread outwards. Flowering occurs between August and December but mostly between September and November and the fruit that follows is an urn-shaped capsule with the sepal lobes remaining.

Taxonomy and naming
Kunzea recurva was first formally described by the botanist Johannes Conrad Schauer and published in 1844 in Johann Georg Christian Lehmann's work Plantae Preissianae. The specific epithet (recurva) is derived from the Latin word, curvus meaning "bent".

Distribution and habitat
Kunzea recurva is an uncommon species, usually found in wet depressions or on rocky slopes in the South West and Great Southern regions of Western Australia, where it grows in a variety of soil types.

References

External links 
 

recurva
Endemic flora of Western Australia
Myrtales of Australia
Rosids of Western Australia
Plants described in 1844